The Thrill of the Skies (Italian: L'ebbrezza del cielo) is a 1940 Italian war film directed by Giorgio Ferroni and starring Silvana Jachino, Mario Giannini and Mario Ferrari. A group of aspiring young pilots in the city of Asiago construct a glider. After service in the Spanish Civil War, they return to a heroic reception in their home city.

Much of the film was shot on location around Asiago. Although mostly filmed in black-and-white, the last few minutes are in Dufaycolor. Ferroni had recently returned from Spain, where he had directed pro-Nationalist documentaries.

Cast
 Silvana Jachino as Maria  
 Mario Giannini as Vittorio 
 Mario Ferrari as L'aviatore  
 Aldo Fiorelli as Franco  
 Fausto Guerzoni as Fausto  
 Franco Brambilla as Il ragazzo 
 Adelmo Cocco as Il sacerdote

References

Bibliography 
 Brunetta, Gian Piero. The History of Italian Cinema: A Guide to Italian Film from Its Origins to the Twenty-first Century.  Princeton University Press, 2009. 
Raimondo-Souto, H. Mario. Motion Picture Photography: A History, 1891-1960. McFarland, 2006.

External links 
 

1940 films
Italian war films
1940 war films
1940s Italian-language films
Films directed by Giorgio Ferroni
Films set in Italy
Films shot in Italy
Italian aviation films
Films shot at Tirrenia Studios
Italian black-and-white films
1940s Italian films